Edgar Domínguez (born 23 December 1962) is an Ecuadorian footballer. He played in 16 matches for the Ecuador national football team from 1987 to 1988. He was also part of Ecuador's squad for the 1987 Copa América tournament.

References

1962 births
Living people
Ecuadorian footballers
Ecuador international footballers
Association football midfielders
People from Cuenca, Ecuador